The Continental Early Warning System (CEWS) is a conflict early warning operation within the African Peace and Security architecture (APSA) of the African Union. Its continued development was supported by United Nations Security Council Resolution 1809.

References

African Union